Hendrik Jacobus Martin Pelser (23 March 1934 – 15 August 2018), known as Martin Pelser, was a South African rugby union international who represented the Springboks in 11 Test matches.

Rugby career
Born in Johannesburg, Pelser attended Rossmore Junior High School and played his provincial rugby for Transvaal.

Pelser debuted for the Springboks against France at Cape Town in 1958 and played his entire Test career as a flanker. In 1960 he scored the only try in South Africa's 8–3 win over the All Blacks in Port Elizabeth. His Test career ended when he switched codes and he earned selection for the South Africa national rugby league team, as a second-rower.

All Black Colin Meads described him as "one of the hardest, most skilful players in any position" that he had played against. His iconic glass eye appearance was the result of a childhood car accident.

See also
List of South Africa national rugby union players

References

External links

1934 births
2018 deaths
Afrikaner people
South African rugby union players
South Africa international rugby union players
Rugby union flankers
Rugby union players from Johannesburg
South African rugby league players
South Africa national rugby league team players
Rugby league second-rows
Rugby league players from Gauteng
Golden Lions players
Sportspeople with a vision impairment